is a Japanese manga series written and illustrated by Yuki Suetsugu. It was serialized in Kodansha's josei manga magazine Be Love from December 2007 to August 2022, with its chapters collected in 50 tankōbon volumes. It is about a school girl, Chihaya Ayase, who is inspired by a new classmate to take up Hyakunin Isshu karuta competitively.

An anime television series adaptation aired from October 2011 to March 2012. The second season aired from January to June 2013 and the third from October 2019 to March 2020. Three live-action film adaptations were released from 2016 to 2018.

As of December 2022, Chihayafuru had over 28 million copies in circulation, making it one of the best-selling manga series. The manga has won the 2nd Manga Taishō and the 35th Kodansha Manga Award. Its popularity has boosted the profile of competitive karuta in Japan.

Plot

Chihaya Ayase is a girl who has spent most of her life simply supporting her sister in her modeling career. That changes when she meets a boy named Arata Wataya, a talented karuta player. After becoming friends, he believes that Chihaya has potential to become a great player. As Chihaya takes on a new dream of becoming Japan's best karuta player, she is soon separated from her karuta playing friends as they grow up. Now in high school, Chihaya is reunited with her childhood friend, Taichi Mashima. Together, they form the Mizusawa Karuta Club. With her teammates and friends supporting her, Chihaya strives to become the best karuta player in the world and to one day be with Arata again.

Development

Yuki Suetsugu belonged to a karuta club in high school and feels that the school years are a period of a person's life where "you can dedicate the most genuine part of yourself to something." The name of the series is a poetic makurakotoba, or pillow word, and comes from the first five syllables of the seventeenth poem in the Hyakunin Isshu poetry anthology, a collection of 100 poems which are printed on the karuta cards. In this poem chihayaburu is used as an epithet to kami and can be translated into English as "shaken in fury" and "swift in fury", according to Edwin A. Cranston, or "awesome", as offered by Joshua S. Mostow.

Media

Manga

Written and illustrated by Yuki Suetsugu, Chihayafuru was serialized in the josei manga magazine Be Love from 28 December 2007 to 1 August 2022, with a spinoff side story chapter released on 1 November 2022. The series' 247 chapters and the side-story chapter were collected by publisher Kodansha into 50 tankōbon volumes, released between 13 May 2008 and 13 December 2022. Kodansha has also published the first three volumes in a two-volume bilingual edition, with English translations by Stuart Varnam Atkin and Yōko Toyozaki. On 14 February 2017, Kodansha Comics began publishing a digital edition of the series in English; 34 volumes have been released as of October 2022. The manga is licensed in French by Pika Édition, in Korean by Haksan Culture Company, in Taiwanese by Tong Li Publishing, and in Thai by Bongkoch Publishing.

Anime

A 25-episode anime television series adaptation, produced by the studio Madhouse under the direction of Morio Asaka, aired on Nippon Television from 4 October 2011 to 27 March 2012. The screenplay was written by Naoya Takayama and character designs were by Kunihiko Hamada. The music was composed by Kousuke Yamashita, and the sound director was Masafumi Mima of Techno Sound. The series was simulcast by Crunchyroll. Animax Asia aired an English version of the anime from 13 February to 18 March 2013. The series was released in nine DVD and Blu-ray Disc volumes from 21 December 2011 to 22 August 2012. A Blu-ray Disc box set was released on 18 July 2013.

A second 25-episode season, Chihayafuru 2, aired on Nippon Television between 11 January and 28 June 2013, and was simulcast by Crunchyroll. An original video animation episode was released on DVD bundled with the special edition of the 22nd manga volume on 13 September 2013. The season was collected in a two-volume Blu-ray and DVD box set released on 22 May 2013 and 18 September 2013.

A 24-episode third season was originally announced to premiere on Nippon Television's AnichU block in April 2019, with the main cast and staff reprising their roles, but was delayed and aired from 22 October 2019 to 24 March 2020. The season was collected in a two-volume Blu-ray and DVD box set released on 25 December 2019 and 25 March 2020.

Sentai Filmworks licensed the first two seasons of the anime series for home video release in North America. The series' first episode premiered with English subtitles on the Hidive streaming service on 15 June 2017. Sentai Filmworks' dub is streamed by Hidive starting from 29 August 2017. The first season was released on DVD and Blu-ray on 12 September 2017. In December 2019, Sentai Filmworks announced that they had licensed the series' third season. The original soundtrack with character song albums was released in two volumes on 18 January and 28 March 2012.

Live-action films
On 11 April 2015, it was reported that the series would be adapted into a live-action film. A film adaptation titled Chihayafuru: Kami no Ku was released on 19 March 2016, with a second film, Chihayafuru: Shimo no Ku, released on 29 April 2016. Chihayafuru: Musubi, a third and final feature length film in the trilogy, was released on 17 March 2018. The films got a five-episode tie-in series on Hulu Japan on 28 February 2018. The series is titled Chihayafuru -Tsunagu- (Chihayafuru: Connect), and connected the story of the second and third films. It also included behind-the-scenes footage and cast interviews. In addition, the third film got another tie-in titled Chihayafuru -Manabi- (Chihayafuru: Study) on Hulu Japan on the same day that introduced the new members of the Mizusawa Karuta Club and explained the rules of karuta. A 3-volume novelization of the films, Eiga Chihayafuru, was published by Kodansha under their KC Deluxe imprint. The first two volumes were released on 11 March 2016 and the third on 13 February 2018. The books were written by Yui Tokiumi, based on the screenplay by Norihiro Koizumi. They were re-released in hardcover from 24 February 2017 to 28 February 2018. Another 3-volume novelization of the films by Yūki Arisawa, Shōsetsu Chihayafuru, was published by Kodansha under their Kodansha Bunko imprint in 2018. The first two volumes were released on 16 January and the third on 15 February.

Other media
Kodansha released several guidebooks for the series, with the first released on 9 November 2011. It provided a study guide for the poetry and background for the story. A 4-volume novel series, Chihayafuru: Chūgakusei-hen, was published by Kodansha under their KC Deluxe imprint between 9 September 2012, and 13 December 2013. The books were written by Yui Tokiumi and illustrated by Yuki Suetsugu and follow the middle-school years of the three protagonists. A manga adapting the novels, written by Tokiumi and illustrated by Oto Tooda, was published in Be Love from 13 October 2017 to 1 November 2018 and compiled into three volumes.

Reception
Chihayafuru won the second Manga Taishō award, and the 35th Kodansha Manga Award in the shōjo category. When Chihayafuru won the Manga Taishō award, it was commented that the series combines elements of the sport genre and literary elements with a discerning eye on the subject matter. It was one of the Jury Recommended Works in the Manga category at the 16th Japan Media Arts Festival in 2012.

The manga had over 16 million copies in circulation in Japan by 2016; over 24 million by the end of 2019; over 27 million by the beginning of 2022; and over 28 million by the end of 2022. Its popularity has boosted the popularity of competitive karuta. The manga has regularly appeared on Oricon's Japanese Comic Ranking chart. Between March 2009 and September 2011, the fourth through fourteenth volumes all appeared in the top 25 during the week of their release and the week after.

Among North American reviewers, Gia Manry, writing about the first episode of Chihayafuru, mentioned that despite the animators' efforts, there was an overuse of CG sakura, describing it as a "mixed bag". Bamboo Dong says that Chihaya's passion and characterisation make karuta interesting. Carlo Santos felt that the series was the "first genuinely good show of the season", citing its characterisation, unusual subject, and polish of the first episode. Marcus Speer enjoyed the production values of the first episode, but felt that the theme songs were "standard fare". He was intrigued by how the characters' childhood impacted on their present interactions. Theron Martin appreciated the focus on the characters rather than the game, feeling that while the Chihaya seemed "gimmicky", her younger self was "quite likable". Chris Beveridge praised the tension shown between Arata and Taichi in the second episode's karuta match. Theron Martin felt the second episode's karuta tournament was tense and compelling, and the plot unfolding in a good way, the execution made this good. Crunchyroll listed it in their "Top 100 best anime of the 2010s". IGN also listed Chihayafuru among the best anime series of the 2010s. Writing for Forbes, Lauren Orsini considered it to be one of the five best anime of 2011; she wrote, "Even Western viewers will quickly become invested in the fast-paced drama of competitive karuta".

Notes

References

External links
 
Chihayafuru at Kodansha Comics
Official NTV website 

2007 manga
2013 anime OVAs
2011 anime television series debuts
2013 anime television series debuts
2013 Japanese television series endings
Card games in anime and manga
Josei manga
Kodansha manga
Madhouse (company)
Madhouse (company) franchises
Manga adapted into films
Manga Taishō
Nippon TV original programming
Romance anime and manga
School life in anime and manga
Sentai Filmworks
Slice of life anime and manga
Sports anime and manga
Winner of Kodansha Manga Award (Shōjo)
Hulu Japan